San Tin is one of the 39 constituencies in the Yuen Long District of Hong Kong.

The constituency returns one district councillor to the Yuen Long District Council, with an election every four years. San Tin constituency is loosely based on San Tin, Mai Po, Ngau Tam Mei and Nam Sang Wai with estimated population of 19,617.

Councillors represented

Election results

2010s

2000s

1990s

References

San Tin
Constituencies of Hong Kong
Constituencies of Yuen Long District Council
1991 establishments in Hong Kong
Constituencies established in 1991